The Eurovision Song Contest 1957 was the second edition of the annual Eurovision Song Contest.

A number of changes to the rules from the previous year's event were enacted, with each country now represented by only one song, which could be performed by up to two performers on stage. The voting system received an overhaul, with each country's jury now comprising ten individuals who could award one vote to their favourite song. The results of the voting were now conducted in public, with a scoreboard introduced to allow the process to be followed by viewers and listeners at home. Jurors were also for the first time not allowed to vote for the song from their own country.

This was Brokken's second appearance as a participant, after previously representing the Netherlands in 1956; her victory marked the first of five Dutch wins in the contest .

Location

The 1957 contest took place in Frankfurt, West Germany. The contest was held in front of an audience of around 400 people.

Germany was subsequently selected to host the second edition, after Hans-Otto Grünefeldt, TV program director at HR, offered to organise it on behalf of ARD.

Format
The contest was hosted by German actress Anaid Iplicjian. The stage built in the  featured a staircase for each artist and conductor to make their entrance, and a harp-shaped background. The centre of the background contained a removable background, allowing for a different graphic to be used for each nation's performance. The entire contest, including the performances and voting, lasted around one hour in total. Held just over nine months after the inaugural contest, the contest date of 3 March remains the earliest date in the calendar year in which the contest has been held.

A number of changes from the rules of the previous year's contest were enacted in 1957. Each country was now permitted to send only one song to compete, as opposed to the maximum of two in 1956. Up to two people were now allowed on stage during the performanceonly solo artists were permitted to compete previouslyhowever no other vocal backing was allowed.

A new voting system was introduced, with ten individuals in each country giving one vote to their favourite song, with no abstentions allowed. In an additional change to the 1956 rules, jurors were not allowed to vote for the song from their own country. A scoreboard was introduced for the first time, and the voting process was now included as part of the broadcast, rather than conducted in secret as in 1956. This new aspect of the contest was inspired by the United Kingdom's Festival of British Popular Songs, which included voting by regional juries and the points received shown on a scoreboard, a telerecording of which was viewed by EBU organisers. Each jury assembled in their own country to follow the contest on television and were then contacted by telephone by the contest's presenter in order to receive their votes, in a change from 1956 when the jurors were co-located to the contest venue.

Each song, as in 1956, was required to last no longer than three minutes and 30 seconds, however several of the competing entries went beyond this limit. Italy's song, which lasted for five minutes and nine seconds, remains the longest song in the contest's history and, despite heavy protest, was not disqualified. Conversely, the United Kingdom's first entry lasted for one minute and 53 seconds in total, and remained the shortest song to compete in the contest until . Subsequently the restriction on song length was more strictly monitored from  onwards. Each entry was performed alongside the  under the direction of the contest's musical director Willy Berking.

Participating countries

Austria and Denmark had originally planned to compete in 1956, but missed the cut-off date for entry.

Conductors
Each country was allowed to nominate their own musical director to lead the orchestra during the performance of their country's entry, with the host musical director, Willy Berking, also conducting for those countries which did not nominate their own conductor. The conductors listed below led the orchestra during the performance for the indicated countries.

Willy Berking
Willy Berking
Eric Robinson
Armando Trovajoli
Carl de Groof
Dolf van der Linden
Willy Berking
Paul Durand
Kai Mortensen
Willy Berking

Participants and results 

Two of the participating artists, Switzerland's Lys Assia and the Netherlands' Corry Brokken, had previously competed at the 1956 contest. Brokken was one of the two Dutch participants in that year's contest, competing with the song "", while Assia had performed both of Switzerland's entries, "" and "", the latter of which had won the contest.

The winner was the  represented by the song "", composed by Guus Jansen, written by Willy van Hemert and performed by Corry Brokken. Notable among this year's participants were Denmark's Birthe Wilke and Gustav Winckler, the first duo to compete in the contest, who made an impact with a passionate on-screen kiss at the end of their performance; and Germany's Margot Hielscher, the first Eurovision act to use a prop during their performance, in this instance a telephone.

Detailed voting results 

The announcement of the results from each country was conducted in reverse order to the order in which each country performed.

Spokespersons 
Each country nominated a spokesperson who was responsible for announcing the votes for their respective country via telephone. Known spokespersons at the 1957 contest are listed below.

Nunzio Filogamo

Broadcasts 

Each participating broadcaster was required to relay the contest via its networks. Non-participating EBU member broadcasters were also able to relay the contest as "passive participants". Broadcasters were able to send commentators to provide coverage of the contest in their own native language and to relay information about the artists and songs to their television viewers. Known details on the broadcasts in each country, including the specific broadcasting stations and commentators are shown in the tables below.

The 1957 contest is the earliest edition to exist in full in the EBU's archives, as the 1956 edition has survived solely through audio recordings, with some missing segments, and limited video footage of the winning reprise performance through newsreel and other recordings. Although the number of households which had access to a television in Europe continued to grow, this edition, as in the case of the 1956 contest, was still mainly accessed by spectators via radio.

Notes and references

Notes

References

Bibliography

External links 

 
1957
Music festivals in Germany
1957 in music
1957 in West Germany
Music in Frankfurt
20th century in Frankfurt
March 1957 events in Europe
Events in Frankfurt
1950s in Hesse